Carex stenantha is a tussock-forming species of perennial sedge in the family Cyperaceae. It is native to far eastern parts of Russia and parts of Japan.

See also
List of Carex species

References

stenantha
Taxa named by Adrien René Franchet
Taxa named by Ludovic Savatier
Plants described in 1878
Flora of Japan
Flora of Kamchatka Krai
Flora of Khabarovsk Krai
Flora of Sakhalin
Flora of the Kuril Islands
Flora of Magadan Oblast